Ervis is an Albanian masculine given name and may refer to:
Ervis Çaço (born 1989), Albanian footballer 
Ervis Kaja (born 1987), Albanian footballer
Ervis Koçi (born 1984), Albanian footballer
Ervis Koçi (born 1998), Albanian footballer
Ervis Kraja (born 1983), Albanian footballer 

Albanian masculine given names